JNL may refer to:
 Jannali railway station, in New South Wales, Australia, station code
 JNL Inc. and JNL Fusion, companies founded by Jennifer Nicole Lee
 Rawat language, a Tibeto-Burman language of India, ISO 639-3 code